CSN3 may refer to:

 CSN3 (gene), a human gene which encodes the protein kappa-casein
 Saint-Jérôme Aerodrome, a private airport in Quebec, Canada